Te Karehana Gardiner-Toi (born 26 October 1993), known by his mononym Teeks, is a Māori soul singer from New Zealand. His debut album, Something to Feel, was released on 26 March 2021.

The music video for his single, "Without You", was released on 19 August 2020. It was directed by Tom Gould and was shot in Hokianga during January 2020. Teeks has said, "It's my favourite place in the world", adding that this is the territory his father is from.

Life and career
Teeks was born in 1993 in Northland and has Ngāpuhi, Ngāi Te Rangi and Ngāti Ranginui whakapapa. He grew up in his father's home in Opononi, near Hokianga from the age of eleven, but also spent significant time in Tauranga, where his mother lives. After high school he studied music and taught Māori at Unitec.

At the 2017 New Zealand Music Awards, Teeks won Best Māori Artist and was nominated for Breakthrough Artist of the Year and Best Soul/RnB Artist.

Discography

Albums

Extended plays

Singles

References

External links
 
 

1993 births
Living people
21st-century New Zealand male singers
New Zealand Māori male singers
People from the Hokianga
Sony Music New Zealand artists
Māori-language singers